The following lists the number one albums on the Australian Albums Chart, during the 1980s. 
The source for this decade is the Kent Music Report up until 20 June 1988, whereafter the source is the ARIA Charts.

1980

1981

1982

1983

1984

1985

1986

1987

1988

1989

See also
List of artists who reached number one on the Australian singles chart
Music of Australia
List of UK Albums Chart number ones of the 1980s

References
David Kent's Australian Chart Book: based on the Kent Music Report
Australian Record Industry Association (ARIA) official site
OzNet Music Chart

1980s
Number 1 albums in Australia
Australia Albums